Davis Corners is an unincorporated community located in Adams County, Wisconsin, United States. The community was named for William A. Davis, who established the post office in May 1855.

References

Unincorporated communities in Adams County, Wisconsin
Unincorporated communities in Wisconsin